Cycling at the 2018 Commonwealth Games was held at the Currumbin Beachfront (road), Nerang National Park (mountain biking), both of which are located in the Gold Coast and Anna Meares Velodrome (track, located in Brisbane) from 5 to 14 April.

A total of 26 events were held: 4 in road cycling, 2 in mountain biking and 20 in track cycling (including four events in para-track cycling). The 26 events were evenly split between men and women. This was done after the Commonwealth Games Federation (CGF) added more women's events in October 2016, to make the games a gender-equal games in terms of overall medal events.

Schedule

Medal summary

Medal table

Road cycling

Track cycling

Men

Women

Para-track cycling

Mountain biking

Records

Participating nations
Multiple athletes took part in more than one discipline. For example, all of Canada's road athletes also competed in the track events.

Road
There are 34 participating nations in road cycling with a total of 167 athletes.

Mountain bike
There are 15 participating nations in mountain biking with a total of 34 athletes.

Track
There are 18 participating nations in track cycling with a total of 146 athletes.

Para-track
There are 6 participating nations in para-track cycling with a total of 8 athletes.

See also  
 Cycling Track Records

References

External links
 Results Book – Cycling – Mountain Bike
 Results Book – Cycling – Track
 Results Book – Cycling – Road

 
2018
Commonwealth Games
2018 Commonwealth Games events
Commonwealth Games, 2018
International cycle races hosted by Australia